Il bell'Antonio ("Handsome Antonio") is a 1960 Italian-French drama film directed by Mauro Bolognini. The film is based on a novel by Vitaliano Brancati and adapted for the screen by Pier Paolo Pasolini and Gino Visentini. It stars Marcello Mastroianni, Claudia Cardinale and Tomas Milian. The film won the Golden Leopard at the Locarno International Film Festival.

Cast
Marcello Mastroianni ...  Antonio Magnano
Claudia Cardinale ...  Barbara Puglisi
Pierre Brasseur ...  Alfio Magnano
Rina Morelli ...  Rosaria Magnano
Tomas Milian ...  Edoardo
Fulvia Mammi ...  Elena Ardizzone
Patrizia Bini ...  Santuzza (as Patrizia Rini)
Anna Arena ...  Signora Puglisi
Nino Camarda
Guido Celano ...  Calderana
Maurizio Conti
Maria Luisa Crescenzi ...  Francesa
Salvatore Fazio
Jole Fierro...  Mariuccia
Cesarina Gherardi...  Zia Giuseppina
Rino Giusti
Gina Mattarolo
Alice Sandro ...  Nanda
Enzo Tiribelli
Ugo Torrente

References

External links
 

1960 films
1960s Italian-language films
French black-and-white films
Italian black-and-white films
Films set in Sicily
Films directed by Mauro Bolognini
1960 drama films
Golden Leopard winners
Films scored by Piero Piccioni
1960s Italian films